Tearle is a surname. Notable people with the surname include:

Conway Tearle (1878–1938), Anglo-American stage actor, stepson of Osmond
Godfrey Tearle (1884–1953), British actor, son of Osmond
Osmond Tearle (1852–1901), British actor

See also
Earle (surname)
Searle (surname)